Everything Is Love (stylized in all caps) is the debut studio album by American musical duo the Carters, consisting of spouses Beyoncé Knowles-Carter and Shawn "Jay-Z" Carter. It was released on June 16, 2018, by Parkwood Entertainment, Sony Music Entertainment, S.C Enterprises, and Roc Nation. Beyoncé and Jay-Z produced the album alongside a variety of collaborators, including Cool & Dre, Boi-1da, and Pharrell Williams. Additional vocalists recorded for the album include Williams, Quavo, Offset (both from Migos), and Ty Dolla Sign, among others. The hip hop and R&B album explores themes of romantic love, fame, wealth, and black pride.

The album was not made public until its release was announced by Beyoncé and Jay-Z while onstage at a London concert for their On the Run II Tour and later through their social media accounts. It was originally exclusive to the music distribution service Tidal, before given a wider release on June 18, 2018. In its first week, Everything Is Love debuted at number two on the US Billboard 200, earning 123,000 album-equivalent units. At the 61st Annual Grammy Awards, the album won for Best Urban Contemporary Album, and was nominated Best Music Video for "Apeshit" and Best R&B Performance for "Summer".

Recording 

Plans about a joint album by the couple were announced by Jay-Z during an interview with The New York Times in 2017 when he said that they used "art almost like a therapy session" to create new music. However, since they also worked on their respective albums 4:44 and Lemonade, and Beyoncé's music progressed more rapidly, the project was temporarily stopped. Rumors about the collaborative project began emerging in March 2018 when the couple announced their On the Run II Tour.

The majority of the album was recorded at U Arena in Paris; "Friends", "Black Effect" and "Salud!" were recorded at Kingslanding Studios West in Los Angeles, while further recording for "Summer" and "Nice" was done at The Church Studios in London. Beyoncé and Jay-Z co-produced all of the songs on the album themselves, with further producers including Pharrell, Cool & Dre, Boi-1da, Jahaan Sweet, David Andrew Sitek, D'Mile, El Michels, Fred Ball, Illmind, MeLo-X, Mike Dean and Nav. The album was predominantly recorded by Stuart White and Gimel "Young Guru" Keaton.

Music and lyrics 

According to Exclaim! journalist Riley Wallace, Everything Is Love is a hip hop album. Mike Wass from Idolator observed a "trap sound and flashy bravado" on the record, while Respect magazine's Jasmine Johnson said it "involves trap with a hint of love". Alexis Petridis found the music more rooted in hip hop than R&B, as did Jogai Bhatt of The Spinoff, who viewed it as a departure from "the sort of contemporary R&B traditionally associated with Beyoncé." Craig Jenkins from Vulture said the singer played the role of an "R&B heavyweight" doubling as a "formidable rapper" throughout the album, showcasing her talents for vocal belting and complex rap cadences.

The album contains lyrics about the couple's romantic love, lavish lifestyle, media worship, wealth, black pride and fame; themes that were found to be characteristic of the whole record. Other songs feature the pair singing about their family affairs as well as maintaining their relationship following hardships (i.e. infidelity). Time magazine's Maura Johnston regarded the album as another "blockbuster duet in R&B and hip-hop"; comparable to Marvin Gaye and Tammi Terrell's soul songs from the 1960s and the 1995 Method Man and Mary J. Blige recording "I'll Be There for You/You're All I Need to Get By"; while incorporating contemporary elements in the form of trap beats, critical references to the National Football League and the Grammy Awards, and playing with "public perceptions of the duo's relationship". Jenkins said it extolled African-American entrepreneurship while presenting Jay-Z as "a doting father and husband, an entrepreneur and altruist with ideas about how everyone else should handle their businesses, a king-tier braggart, and a rap legend".

Artwork 

The artwork for the album is a still frame from the music video for "Apeshit". It features two of Beyoncé's background dancers, Jasmine Harper and Nicholas "Slick" Stewart, at the Louvre—Harper is seen picking the hair of Stewart while standing in front of Leonardo da Vinci's Mona Lisa.

Release and promotion 

On June 6, 2018, Beyoncé and Jay-Z embarked on the joint On the Run II Tour, a sequel to their 2014 On the Run Tour. At the end of their second show at London Stadium in London on June 16, 2018, Beyoncé announced to the crowd that the duo had a surprise before leaving the stage. Then, the music video for "Apeshit" played on the LED video screen onstage. Following the conclusion of the video, the words "ALBUM OUT NOW" came across the screen. Everything Is Love was subsequently released exclusively via Jay-Z's streaming service Tidal and all audience members received a free six-month trial subscription in order to be able to stream the album. The album was also made available for purchase on Tidal's online music store. The release was announced worldwide on the Beyoncé and Jay-Z's respective social media accounts with the artist of the album being monikered as the Carters. On the same day, the music video for the album's second track and lead single, "Apeshit", was released on Beyoncé's official YouTube channel. It was directed by Ricky Saiz and filmed at the Louvre in Paris.

On June 18, the album was made available across numerous other platforms, including iTunes Store, Apple Music, Deezer, Amazon Music, Napster, Google Play Music and Spotify.

Critical reception 

Everything is Love was met with general acclaim. At Metacritic, which assigns a normalized rating out of 100 to reviews from professional critics, the album received an average score of 80, based on 22 reviews.

Reviewing the album for The New York Times, Joe Coscarelli said it "completes the Knowles-Carter conceptual trilogy"—referring to the previous releases of Lemonade and 4:44—"in an expert, tactical showing of family brand management". Music critic Nicholas Hautman of Us Weekly wrote: "It's clear from the very first listen that Beyoncé outshines her husband on much of the record, which really should have been marketed as 'Beyoncé featuring Jay-Z' rather than 'Beyoncé and Jay-Z' (or 'the Carters', in this case). His verses are few and far between in comparison to hers, but it still somehow feels like a balanced body of work from two of the greatest artists of our time." In The Guardian, Petridis believed the album retreads braggadocio centering around the duo's wealth and excellence, with less musical daring, but still does so with likeable music, genuine wit, and energy. As per The Daily Telegraph music critic Neil McCormick pointed, "Everything Is Love certainly doesn’t have the musical expansiveness of Lemonade. There are neither ballads nor bangers, and not much in the way of melodic song construction at all. Rather, these are snappily repetitive beats on which the stars can put across their message as a form of hip hop conversation." For Variety, Jim Aswad described it as "solid and generally satisfying, but not the best from either."

Will Hodgkinson of The Times reviewed track-by-track, stated: "Jay-Z is as dynamic as ever and the new, though Beyoncé demands attention on this surprise album, [...] despite the ups and downs detailed on Beyoncé's Lemonade and Jay-Z's subsequent mea culpa 4:44. Instead they are coming out fighting, with all that fame and money making them defensive, even paranoid, while a mix of classic soul, hard-hitting hip-hop and slinky R&B." Pitchfork contributor Briana Younger wrote that the album "is a compromise between the spoils of Lemonades war and the fruits of 4:44s labor", and that "within this complex, messy and beautifully black display, the Carters find absolution." Giving the album one and a half stars, Adam Rothbarth of Tiny Mix Tapes stated that everything about the album "feels superficial, from the artists' constant pronouncement of their love for each other to their engagement with topics like fashion". He also added that the "most boring aspect of the album is its centerpiece: the couple's obsession with their wealth".

Accolades

Commercial performance 

Everything is Love debuted at number two on the US Billboard 200 chart, earning 123,000 album-equivalent units, (including 70,000 copies as pure album sales) in its first week. The album debuted on the chart after less than six full days of activity on Tidal, and four days of activity on all other digital retailers and streaming services. In its second week, the album dropped to number four on the chart, earning an additional 59,000 units. In its third week, the album dropped to number eight on the chart, earning 33,000 more units. In its fourth week, the album remained at number eight on the chart, earning 29,000 units. In 2018, Everything is Love was ranked as the 70th most popular album of the year on the Billboard 200. On January 14, 2019, the album was certified gold by the Recording Industry Association of America (RIAA) for combined sales and album-equivalent units of over 500,000 units in the United States.

Impact 
The album's track "Nice" was interpolated in Brazilian singer Ludmilla's 2023 single "Sou Má".

Track listing 

 All tracks noted as "ChopNotSlop Remix" and credited to, The Carters, OG Ron C, Slim K and DJ Candlestick

Notes
  Simon Mavin is incorrectly credited as Simon Marvin
  Jun Kozuki is incorrectly credited as Jan Kozuki

Sample credits

 "Apeshit" contains
 elements of an A$AP Rocky broadcast on Instagram Live.
 an interpolation of "Faneto", performed by Chief Keef, written by Keith Farrelle Cozart.
 "713" contains
 an interpolation of "Still D.R.E.", performed by Dr. Dre and Snoop Dogg, written by Melvin Bradford, Shawn Carter, Scott Storch and Andre Young.
 samples from "Sphinx Gate", performed by Hiatus Kaiyote, written by Paul Bender, Simon Mavin, Perrin Moss and Naomi Saalfield.
 samples from "The World It Softly Lulls", performed by Hiatus Kaiyote, written by Paul Bender, Simon Mavin, Perrin Moss and Naomi Saalfield.
 an interpolation of "The Light", performed by Common, written by Robert Caldwell, Norman Harris, Lonnie Lynn, Bruce Malament and James Yancey.
 "Heard About Us" contains
 an interpolation of "Juicy", performed by The Notorious B.I.G., written by Sean Puffy Combs, James Mtume, Jean-Claude Olivier and Christopher Wallace.
 "Black Effect" contains
 a sample of "Broken Strings", performed by Flower Travellin' Band, written by Jun Kozuki.
 "LoveHappy" contains
 a sample of "You Make My Life a Sunny Day", performed by Eddie & Ernie, written by Eddie Campbell, Ernie Johnson and Pete James.
 elements of "Victory Is Certain" from APC Tracks Vol. 1, written by Bill Laswell, Jean Touitou and Thierry Planell.
 an interpolation of "Love of My Life (An Ode to Hip-Hop)" performed by Erykah Badu and Common, written by Lonnie Lynn, Robert Ozuna, James Poyser, Raphael Saadiq, Glenn Standridge and Erica Wright.
 samples from the Graham Central Station recording "The Jam", written by Larry Graham.

Personnel 
Credits adapted from Beyoncé's official website, Tidal and the album's liner notes. "Salud!" is track 10.

Musicians 

 Beyoncé                            – vocals 
 Jay-Z                              – vocals 
 Rory Stonelove – additional vocals 
 Anthony Wilmot                         – additional vocals 
 Offset             – additional vocals 
 Quavo                              – additional vocals 
 Blue Ivy Carter                        – additional vocals 
 Ty Dolla Sign                      – additional vocals 
 Pharrell         – additional vocals 
 Nija Charles                       – background vocals 
 Dr. Lenora Antoinette Stines           – additional vocals 
 Andre Christopher Lyon  – additional vocals 
 Derek Dixie                            – string arrangement & additional keyboards ; horn arrangement 
 Chala Yancy                            – co-arrangement & strings 
 Nathalie Barrett-Mas                   – co-arrangement & strings 
 Crystal Alforque                       – co-arrangement & strings 
 Jessica McJunkins                      – co-arrangement & strings 
 Corbin Jones                           – co-arrangement ; horns 
 Christopher Gray                       – co-arrangement ; horns 
 Christopher Johnson                    – co-arrangement ; horns 
 Crystal Torres                         – co-arrangement ; horns 
 Arnetta Johnson                        – co-arrangement ; horns 
 Lessie Vonner                          – co-arrangement ; horns 
 Michael Jones                          – co-arrangement & horns 
 Damien Farmer                          – bass guitar 
 Peter Ortega                           – horns 
 Randy Ellis                            – horns 
 Richard Lucchese                       – horns 
 808-Ray                                – additional programming

Technical 

 Tyler Scott                 – string engineering , recording , assistant mix engineering 
 Stuart White                – recording ; mixing 
 Gimel Keaton – recording ; mixing 
 Mike Larson                 – recording 
 DJ Durel                – recording 
 Zeph Sowers                 – recording 
 Tony Maserati           – mixing 
 Leslie Brathwaite           – mixing 
 Chris Godbey                – mixing 
 Dan Ewins                   – assistant mix engineering ; assistant engineering 
 Henri Davies                – assistant mix engineering 
 Andy Maxell                 – assistant mix engineering 
 Adrien Crapanzano           – assistant engineering 
 Marcus Locock               – assistant engineering 
 Lester Mendoza              – assistant horn recording ; assistant string recording 
 Colin Leonard               – mastering 
 Teresa LaBarbera Whites – A&R

Production 

 Beyoncé                                   – production ; co-production ; vocal production 
 Jay-Z                                     – production ; co-production ; vocal production 
 Cool & Dre                            – production 
 Pharrell                                  – production 
 Boi-1da                               – production 
 Jahaan Sweet                              – production 
 D'Mile                                – production 
 Vinylz                                – production 
 !llmind                       – production 
 David Andrew Sitek         – production 
 El Michels               – co-production 
 Nav                      – co-production 
 Sevn Thomas                           – co-production 
 Beat Butcha                               – co-production 
 Fred Ball        – additional production 
 Stuart White                              – additional production 
 Derek Dixie                               – additional production 
 Mike Dean – additional production 
 MeLo-X                                – additional production 
 808-Ray                                   – additional production 
 Nova Wav                                  – additional production

Charts

Weekly charts

Year-end charts

Certifications

Release history

References

External links 
 

2018 debut albums
Albums produced by Beyoncé
Albums produced by Boi-1da
Albums produced by Cool & Dre
Albums produced by Illmind
Albums produced by Mike Dean (record producer)
Albums produced by Nav (rapper)
Albums produced by Pharrell Williams
Albums produced by Beat Butcha
Beyoncé albums
Collaborative albums
Grammy Award for Best Urban Contemporary Album
Jay-Z albums
Roc Nation albums
Sony Music albums
Surprise albums
Trap music albums
Albums recorded at The Church Studios